Ashton Moss is a tram stop on the East Manchester Line, built as part of Phase 3b of the Manchester Metrolink. The station opened on 9 October 2013, ahead of the originally-publicised schedule of the winter of 2013–14. The stop has an island platform, and is located on Lord Sheldon Way near the Ashton Moss leisure complex and Snipe Retail Park on Ashton New Road. The station is served by a 200 space Park + Ride car park, with electric vehicle parking facilities.

Services

Services are mostly every 12 minutes on all routes.

References

External links

 https://web.archive.org/web/20090411103135/http://www.lrta.org/Manchester/phase3b.html
Metrolink stop information
Ashton Moss area map

Tram stops in Tameside
Tram stops on the Bury to Ashton-under-Lyne line